Gregor Angus Bethune Robertson (born September 18, 1964) is a Canadian entrepreneur and a progressive politician, who served as the 39th mayor of Vancouver, British Columbia, from 2008 to 2018. As the longest serving Mayor in Vancouver's history, Robertson and his team led the creation and implementation of the Greenest City 2020 Action Plan and spearheaded the city's first comprehensive Economic Action Strategy.

Robertson was elected to the position of mayor of Vancouver as part of the Vision Vancouver slate. Prior to that, he served as a Member of the Legislative Assembly for Vancouver-Fairview, as a member of the New Democratic Party of British Columbia, from 2005 until his resignation in 2008 to run for the mayoral position. On January 10, 2018, Robertson announced that he would not seek re-election after three terms in office.

Background

Robertson was born in North Vancouver in 1964. His father was an attorney with Russell Dumoulin, a prominent Vancouver law firm, and his mother was a teacher. After his parents divorced, Robertson grew up partly in Portola Valley, near San Francisco with his mother, and later with his father in North Vancouver. In 1982, he graduated from Carson Graham Secondary School in North Vancouver and attended Colorado College and the University of British Columbia, graduating from the former with a BA in English and Biology. After graduating, he intended to become a physician, but the University of British Columbia School of Medicine rejected his application. Robertson then completed Emergency Medical Technician (EMT/paramedic) training but turned his career focus to healthy food and nutrition. .

His relations include grandfather Dr. Emile Therrien, a pioneering doctor, and Dr. Norman Bethune, his grandmother's cousin, a noted anti-fascist and Communist famous for battlefield medicine in the Spanish Civil War and the Second Sino-Japanese War.

He worked on a ranch as a cowboy in the Cariboo restored a wooden sailboat and sailed across the Pacific for 18 months, accompanied by his wife, Amy, whom he had met in Colorado. They settled in New Zealand, where he was attracted to, and began, farming as a trade. After turning 25, he returned to Canada, where he purchased land in Glen Valley near Fort Langley, and made his living as a farmer there.

Robertson went on to co-found Happy Planet, a Vancouver-based company that produces and markets organic fruit and vegetable beverages and soups. He was named one of Canada's "Top 40 under 40" by The Globe and Mail. He was also a Tides Canada director from 2002 until 2004, when he entered politics with the provincial New Democratic Party.

He was elected to the Legislative Assembly in the 2005 election as a member of the British Columbia New Democratic Party having defeated the trade union leader Judy Darcy in a high-profile battle for the party's nomination. He then beat British Columbia Liberal Party's Virginia Greene in the general election. During his time as the MLA for Vancouver-Fairview, Robertson served as the Opposition Critic for Advanced Education, Small Business Critic and as the Co-Chair of the Caucus Climate Change Taskforce.

2008 mayoral campaign

In February 2008, Robertson announced that he would run for Mayor of Vancouver. In June 2008, Robertson secured the Vision Vancouver party's nomination as its mayoral candidate, defeating Raymond Louie and Allan De Genova.  Robertson soon announced his resignation from the Legislative Assembly effective July 15, 2008. His main rival was Peter Ladner of the Non-Partisan Association.

In November 2008, Robertson came under scrutiny after reporters discovered that he had an unpaid transit infraction fine from the SkyTrain system. While the public generally appeared willing to accept his explanation that the original infraction was a mistake, he was criticized by some for attempting to spin his failure to pay into a politically positive statement. Robertson ultimately paid the $173 fine.

He was elected by a solid margin in the 2008 municipal election. Seven of the ten seats on Vancouver City Council also went to Robertson's Vision Vancouver party. "It was a hard-fought campaign," he told supporters gathered at the Fairmont Hotel Vancouver, "but there is far more that unites us than divides us."

Robertson's campaign received donations from at least two American supporters.  Councilor Ellen Woodsworth, who ran as part of the coalition led by Robertson in the 2008 election, later called for a ban on foreign campaign donations such as those received by Robertson.

Mayoral term

Action on homelessness 
Under Robertson's leadership, Vancouver City Council made important progress in reducing homelessness, including the approval of more than 600 temporary modular homes; however, providing safe and affordable housing for Vancouver's most vulnerable residents continues to be a challenge. The 12th annual Homeless Count in Vancouver held in 2018 saw a 2% increase in homeless residents since the 2017 count, compared with a 16% increase between 2016 and 2017. Of those counted in 2018, 659 were living on the street and 1,522 were living in shelters, compared to 537 street homeless and 1,601 sheltered in 2017. Fifty-two per cent of those counted reported being homeless for less than a year, showing the fluidity of homelessness year over year in Vancouver, and in 2017, the Homelessness Service's Outreach Team secured 850 homes for residents who were homeless or at risk of homelessness.

In September 2017, the Government of British Columbia announced a funding commitment of $66 million towards building 600 units of temporary modular housing in Vancouver. In partnership with the B.C Government, temporary modular homes are being built in a matter of months on empty or underutilized City-owned land, providing immediate relief to hundreds of people living without a home, as well as access to 24/7 supports, including life skills training and health services.

Issues of marginalized people

Mental health advocate position
During the 2008 campaign, Robertson promised he would establish a mental health advocate position, as previously recommended by Vision Vancouver councilor Heather Deal. In September 2009, it was announced that there were no plans to do so, and that instead the task would be added to the responsibilities of city staff.

Homeless Emergency Action Team (HEAT)
On December 9, 2008, he announced low-barrier HEAT shelters to assist Vancouver’s homeless citizens during an extremely cold winter, which were filled to capacity.

Two of the shelters in a residential neighbourhood near a daycare centre and senior housing facility at the North end of the Granville Street Bridge were controversial.  Community residents cited concerns with lack of public consultation, fights, public urination, defecation, public sex, and open drug use. British Columbia Housing Minister Rich Coleman cited the need for laying out rules of operation and the need for better community consultation. He called Robertson's bargaining on housing homeless people "amateurish" and later apologized for the remark. Robertson reached an agreement with Housing Minister Rich Coleman and came to a mutual decision to close one shelter and reassess another. The second controversial shelter shut down on August 5, 2009, as alternate housing was found. Later that year, Penny Ballem, the unelected city manager, notified council about a federal proposal from the Mental Health Commission of Canada to address the homeless crisis by turning the 102-room low-budget Bosman's Hotel on Howe Street near Helmcken Street into an experiment designed to see if aggressive health treatment along with housing could help the same target population.  Council will decide on the proposal in the Fall of 2009.  Council member Kerry Jang was said to be behind the Vancouver portion of the project.  On September 15, 2009, Vancouver city staff issued a report warning Robertson and the City Council that they should no longer expect the HEAT shelters to be funded after the 2009–2010 fiscal year.

On January 5, 2010, Robertson announced that the controversial shelter at 1435 Granville Street, in a predominantly residential neighbourhood, would re-open the following day without robust neighbourhood consultations.  It is scheduled to close by April 30, 2010. The city is planning an open house approximately two weeks after re-opening the shelter.

Green issues

Greenest City Action Team
On February 25, 2009, Robertson announced the members of the Greenest City Action Team in support of his campaign promise to make Vancouver the greenest city in the world. In April 2009, Robertson and the Greenest City Action Team released a report outlining quick-start recommendations to move aggressively on its green plan. The report focused on three key areas: jobs and the economy, greener communities, and protecting human health.

China democracy controversy
In September 2010 on a trip to China, Robertson was questioned about working with an authoritarian regime by the CBC to which he responded, "You can question how worthwhile democracy is in a lot of countries right now."  Upon returning to Canada he later admitted he was guilty of a "poor choice of words".

Transportation issues

Canada Line

Robertson was a strong supporter of Cambie Street merchants and spoke regularly about hardships from the Canada Line construction.  He called the handling of the rail line construction an "injustice".  On March 23, 2009, Robertson testified in a lawsuit brought by a Cambie Street plebiscite merchant in the B.C. Supreme Court regarding damage to her business from the construction, a lawsuit for which the merchant was awarded $600,000 by the B.C. Supreme Court because in part there was insufficient action to mitigate the effects of Canada Line construction on Cambie Street merchants.  This decision was later appealed and overturned at the B.C. Court of Appeal on February 18, 2012. On the Canada Line opening day of August 17, 2009, Robertson said Greater Vancouver needed more rapid transit but the Canada Line was a "great start" and that he was a "Johnny-come-lately" to the project.

Arbutus rail corridor
The City of Vancouver has been trying to acquire the disused railway line running adjacent to Arbutus Street from Marpole to Granville Island. The line is private property owned by CP who have been trying to sell it to the City of Vancouver after many citizens objected to their plans to develop it for housing.

Toll proposal
On September 17, 2009, Robertson called for adding a toll to the Sea-to-Sky Highway, the primary driving route between Vancouver and Whistler, British Columbia, and to all major crossings of the Fraser River to help fund Translink. British Columbia Minister of Transportation Shirley Bond dismissed the proposal by stating that the Province has no plans to add a toll to the Sea-to-Sky Highway, and that the Province was not contemplating a change in tolling strategy.

Cycling and livability
Robertson and his team led the charge on cycling infrastructure, transforming Vancouver into one of the world's most livable cities. In an April 2008 speech to a Critical Mass rally, Robertson requested the assistance of Critical Mass riders to help get him elected.  He took part in the April 2008 ride by illegally riding without a helmet to show his support for the protesters. However, in July 2009, after he was elected, he expressed that he was "pissed off" at Critical Mass because organizers had not announced the route for the next ride and would not participate. Vancouver's Critical Mass does not plan its routes.

Cycling had been growing in popularity in Vancouver as it has all over the world and the desire of its citizens to cycle for at least some of their trips had been growing for decades however little was done before July 2009 when the Burrard Bridge bicycle lane trial was initiated to determine whether creating a new protected bike lane was a viable solution to increase the safety and comfort of people cycling and walking while still maintaining an effective flow of traffic.
During his mayorship, the City's flagship project was the Seaside Greenway, running from downtown Vancouver to the Jericho Beach. This active transportation corridor was created by repurposing one lane of automobile traffic from the Burrard Bridge as well as blocking through vehicular traffic from the prestigious Point Grey Road.

Bylaw changes

In July 2009, Robertson led the Vancouver City Council to pass several bylaw changes—including security checkpoints, closed-circuit cameras, prohibition of "disturbance or nuisance interfering with the enjoyment of entertainment on city land by other persons", and prohibition of commercial flyers at celebration sites—which were controversial for some civil liberties advocates who argued that they "make it more difficult to exercise [the] fundamental constitutional rights to free speech, peaceful assembly and free expression."  As part of the changes city manager Penny Ballem, an unelected official, was given special powers that were referred to by Coalition of Progressive Electors councilor Ellen Woodsworth as "wide open carte blanche." Robertson defended council's position, explaining the bylaw changes were necessary given what Vancouver is expected to achieve in February 2010. According to Robertson, "It is our ultimate obligation to ensure the safety and security of people who are in our city and this, I think, addresses a lot of the concerns proactively on that level while respecting the Charter of Rights and Freedoms. This is a temporary set of changes we're putting it in place for a special event."

Robertson also implemented a bylaw in April 2014 that prevented homeowners from cutting trees down on their own private property. The bylaw was proposed due to the rapid reduction in tree cover in the City of Vancouver. Many of the trees had been removed by property developers, with the blessing of the City Council, yet it is homeowners who are suffering from the restrictions. Legal experts believe that the bylaw is unconstitutional and a Supreme Court case will be imminent.

Vancouver charter amendment
On January 12, 2009, Robertson requested an amendment to the Vancouver Charter to allow the city to borrow $458 million to fund the completion of the 2010 Olympic Village in False Creek without seeking approval from taxpayers in an election-day plebiscite.  Robertson said this was due to extraordinary circumstances.  The amendment was passed on January 18, 2009, in an emergency session of the Legislative Assembly of British Columbia.

Vancouver Stanley Cup riot
On June 15, 2011, the 2011 Vancouver Stanley Cup riot occurred after a Vancouver Canucks loss in game 7 of the Stanley Cup final.  Robertson attributed the situation to "a small group of troublemakers".  Bob Whitelaw, author of a report into the 1994 Vancouver Stanley Cup riot, indicated that authorities had made several mistakes in the planning for the crowd—among them allowing parked cars near the screens and leaving newspaper boxes nearby which could be used as projectiles.  It was later claimed by Vancouver Police Chief Jim Chu that Bob Whitelaw was not a contributor to the final report, and that all recommendations of the final report had been followed. Robertson admitted to not having read the 1994 report.  Suzanne Anton dubbed the riot as "Robertson's Riot", a moniker which was picked up by some media outlets.  Robertson later accepted some of the responsibility for allowing the riot to occur.

2014 Vancouver civic election
On November 15, 2014, Robertson was re-elected as Mayor of Vancouver, defeating opponent Kirk LaPointe by 5 percent.

Family and personal life
Robertson was previously married to Amy Oswald, whom he met at Colorado College, and they have three children. In 2012, Robertson's foster son Jinagh was arrested on cocaine and firearms charges. On July 5, 2014, the Robertsons announced their separation in a joint statement.  Robertson was the partner of pop singer Wanting Qu from January 2015 to May 2017.

Robertson is married to Eileen Park Robertson, a journalist, filmmaker, communications professional  and climate/racial justice advocate. The two met in Copenhagen at the C40 World Mayors Climate Summit. In 2020, they married at Stanley Park in Vancouver, paying tribute to their ancestral roots by wearing the Clan Robertson tartan and a Park family emblem. When news of their interracial marriage was published in Vogue magazine, Eileen, a Korean-American, was targeted with racist and misogynist hate. She spoke out about her personal experiences with racism while working in media and government.

Robertson is also a tuba player; he and his former MLA colleague Nicholas Simons performed on country-punk musician Slim Milkie's 2010 album Silverado.

He is a distant relative of Norman Bethune. His grandmother was a first cousin of the Canadian doctor, a hero of the mainland Chinese Communist Revolution.

Election results

2008 election for mayor

2011 election for mayor

2014 election for mayor

References

External links

1964 births
Businesspeople from Vancouver
Canadian drink industry businesspeople
British Columbia New Democratic Party MLAs
Canadian chief executives
Canadian expatriates in New Zealand
Canadian farmers
Colorado College alumni
Living people
Mayors of Vancouver
People from Langley, British Columbia (city)
People from North Vancouver
21st-century Canadian politicians